The Copenhagen Philharmonic Orchestra (Danish: Sjællands Symfoniorkester), also known as the Tivoli Symphony Orchestra, is a Danish symphony orchestra which both serves as Danish Regional Orchestra for the region of Zealand and, for the summer season while the Tivoli Gardens are open, as resident orchestra in the Tivoli Concert Hall.

History
The history of the orchestra dates back to 1843 when Georg Carstensen, in connection with the opening of the Tivoli Gardens, engaged Hans Christian Lumbye to be responsible for music in the gardens. Ever since, the orchestra has performed in the gardens during the summer season. In 1846, the orchestra was expanded to 33 members and started to perform symphony concerts under the name Tivolis Orkester. In 1848, the composer Niels Gade started to arrange concerts in Copenhagen with the musicians from the Tivoli Orchestra as a basis for the winter concerts.

Until 2009, the Orchestra was based in the Tivoli Concert Hall. Since then the Copenhagen Philharmonic has been based at the former Danmarks Radio concert hall, which is now the concert hall of the Royal Danish Academy of Music.  During the summer season, while the Tivoli Gardens are open, the orchestra continues to perform in the Tivoli Concert Hall under the name the Tivoli Symphony Orchestra.

The orchestra's most recent chief conductor was Lan Shui, from 2007 through 2015.  In February 2016, the orchestra announced the appointment of Toshiyuki Kamioka as its next chief conductor, for the initial period from 2016 through 2020.

Chief conductors
 Heinrich Schiff (1996–2000)
 Giordano Bellincampi (2000–2005)
 Lan Shui (2007–2015)
 Toshiyuki Kamioka (since 2016)

See also
 List of concert halls in Denmark

References

External links
 Official Copenhagen Philharmonic website

Danish orchestras
Musical groups established in 1843
Musical groups established in 1965
Culture in Copenhagen
1843 establishments in Denmark